GURPS Discworld and the related supplements are role-playing game sourcebooks set in Terry Pratchett's Discworld fantasy universe using the GURPS role-playing game system. GURPS Discworld was designed by Phil Masters (in collaboration with Pratchett) and first published in 1998.

Contents
The game included a lot of detail about Discworld, appealing to both roleplaying and Discworld fans. It has also been attributed to introducing roleplayers to the series of Discworld books.

Publication history
GURPS Discworld was written by Phil Masters and Terry Pratchett; its cover and illustrations were done by Paul Kidby. It was published by Steve Jackson Games in 1998. GURPS Discworld was the first book to include the GURPS Lite rules. The GURPS Lite rules were included as an appendix, meaning it was not necessary to purchase GURPS Basic in order to play.

In March 2001, Steve Jackson Games published a sequel under the title GURPS Discworld Also. It was written by Phil Masters, again with the assistance of Terry Pratchett. Cover and illustrations were done by Sean Murray. The supplement covered recent events in the book series, including details about the Unseen University. Among the scenarios included is EckEckEcksEcksian Cart Wars, based on the Mad Max parody segments of The Last Continent and Steve Jackson Games' own Car Wars and GURPS Autoduel setting. It also included the first detailed rules for mechanical semaphore telegraphy, based on the "clacks" network in the books.

The original book was republished in 2002 by Steve Jackson Games with the GURPS Lite rules integrated throughout the text. The title was changed from GURPS Discworld to Discworld Roleplaying Game to reinforce its stand-alone capabilities. Illustrations were once again done by Paul Kidby. Some subsequent publications, including the second edition of Discworld, were labelled "Powered by GURPS" rather than having the name "GURPS" in the book title, to make them easier to find at stores.

A fourth edition adaptation of the Discworld was written, playtested, and laid out, but had trouble getting to market according to Steve Jackson Games' 2014 Stakeholder's Report. It was finally released in December 2016.

Books
GURPS Discworld (1998), Steve Jackson Games
GURPS Discworld Also (2001), Steve Jackson Games
Discworld Role-Playing Game (2002), Steve Jackson Games
Discworld Roleplaying Game (2016), Steve Jackson Games

See also
List of GURPS books

References

External links
Extra (Sometimes Highly Unofficial) Material Pertaining to the Discworld Roleplaying Game by author Phil Masters
GURPS Discworld bye Nighte

Comedy role-playing games
Discworld games
Fantasy role-playing games
Discworld
GURPS 3rd edition
GURPS 4th edition
Role-playing games based on novels
Role-playing game supplements introduced in 1998